The Madan Singh class of tugboats are series of service watercraft built by Tebma Shipyard Limited (a subsidiary  of Bharati Shipyard Ltd), for Indian navy during 1999. Propulsion is provided by Voith Schneider Propellers. The  is a follow-up order of the Madan Singh-class tugboat.

Ships of the class

Specifications
Displacement: 382 tonnes
Length: 32.5 meters
Breadth: 9.50 meters
Depth: 4 meters
Speed: 12 knots
Bollard pull: 25 tons
Main engines: Wartsila 8 L20
Power output: 2 x 1320 kW at 1000 RPM

See also
Tugboats of the Indian Navy

References

External links
From Ships to Reefs
Tebma Shipyards

 
Auxiliary ships of the Indian Navy
Tugs of the Indian Navy
Auxiliary tugboat classes